The World Psychiatric Association is an international umbrella organisation of psychiatric societies.

Objectives and goals 
Originally created to produce world psychiatric congresses, it has evolved to hold regional meetings, to promote professional education and to set ethical, scientific and treatment standards for psychiatry.

History 
Jean Delay was the first president of the Association for the Organization of World Congresses of Psychiatry when it was started in 1950. Donald Ewen Cameron became president of the World Psychiatric Association at its formal founding in 1961.

In February 1983, the Soviet All-Union Society of Neurologists and Psychiatrists resigned from the World Psychiatric Association. This resignation occurred as a preemptive action amid a movement to expel the Soviet body from the global organization due to political abuse of psychiatry in the Soviet Union. The Soviet body was conditionally readmitted into the World Psychiatric Association in 1989, following some improvements in human rights conditions, and an intensive debate among the association's delegates, in which the acting secretary of the Soviet delegation issued a statement conceding that "previous political conditions in the U.S.S.R. created an environment in which psychiatric abuse occurred, including for nonmedical reasons."

 Helen Herrman is president, and Afzal Javed is president-elect.

Structure 
 the institutional members of the World Psychiatric Association are 138 national psychiatric societies in 118 countries representing more than 200,000 psychiatrists worldwide. The societies are clustered into 18 zones and four regions: the Americas, Europe, Africa & Middle East, and Asia & Australasia. Representatives of the societies constitute the World Psychiatric Association General Assembly, the governing body of the organization. The association also has individual members and there are provisions for affiliation of other associations (e.g., those dealing with a particular topic in psychiatry). There are 72 scientific sections.

Publications 
The official publication of the association is World Psychiatry. World Psychiatry and the association's official books are published by Wiley-Blackwell. WPA also self-publishes a quarterly newsletter on its website.

Several WPA scientific sections have their own official journals and newsletters:
 Journals
  (Psychiatric Electrophysiology Section)
 Archives of Women's Mental Health (Women's Mental Health Section)
 History of Psychiatry (History of Psychiatry Section)
  (Ecology, Psychiatry and Mental Health Section)
 International Journal of Mental Health (Psychiatric Rehabilitation Section)
 Journal of Affective Disorders (Affective Disorders Section)
 Journal of Intellectual Disability Research (Psychiatry of Intellectual Disability Section)
 Journal of Mental Health Policy and Economics (Mental Health Economics Section)
 Personality and Mental Health (Personality Disorders Section)
 Psychiatry in General Practice (Rural Mental Health Section)
 Psychopathology (Classification, Diagnostic Assessment and Nomenclature Section; Clinical Psychopathology Section)
  (Disaster Psychiatry Section)
  (Disaster Psychiatry Section)
 Transcultural Psychiatry (Transcultural Psychiatry Section)
 Newsletters
 Art & Psychiatry Section (Section of the Psychopathology of Expression)
 Child and Adolescent Psychiatry
 Early Career Psychiatrists
 Psyche and Spirit (Section on Religion, Spirituality and Psychiatry) 
 Psychological Consequences of Torture and Persecutions Section
 Psychotherapy Section
 World Healer (Transcultural Psychiatry Section)

Activities 
The association has helped establish a code of professional ethics for psychiatrists. The association has also looked into charges regarding China's treatment of the Falun Gong.

References

External links 
 
 WPA Section on Religion, Spirituality and Psychiatry
 WPA Transcultural Psychiatry Section

 
International medical associations
Psychiatric associations
Scientific supraorganizations
Organisations based in Geneva
Professional associations based in Switzerland
Scientific organisations based in Switzerland
Scientific organizations established in 1961
1961 establishments in Switzerland